The 2022-23 Kategoria e Dytë is the 51st official season of the Albanian football third division since its establishment. There are 23 teams competing this season, split in 2 groups. The winners of the groups will play the league's final against each other and also gain promotion to the 2023–24 Kategoria e Parë. Teams ranked from the 2nd to the 5th position will qualify to the play-off round which they played against the 9th and 10th ranked teams in the 2022–23 Kategoria e Parë.

Changes from last season

Team changes

From Kategoria e Dytë
Promoted to Kategoria e Parë:
 Flamurtari
 Luzi 2008
 Oriku

Relegated to Kategoria e Tretë:
 Gramozi
 Internacional Tirana
 Këlcyra
 Klosi
 Përmeti

To Kategoria e Dytë
Relegated from Kategoria e Parë:
 Butrinti
 Maliqi
 Pogradeci
 Shkumbini
 Vora

Promoted from Kategoria e Tretë:
 Delvina
 Elbasani
 Valbona

Locations

Stadia by capacity and locations

Group A

Group B

League standings

Group A

Results

Group B

Results

Top scorers

Notes

References

3
Albania
Kategoria e Dytë seasons